Tourism in Djibouti is one of the growing economic sectors of the country and is an industry that generates 53,000 and 73,000 arrivals per year, with its favorable beaches and climate and also including islands and beaches in the Gulf of Tadjoura and the Bab al-Mandab. The main tourist activities are scuba diving, fishing, trekking and hiking, discovering the nomadic way, bird watching, and sun, sea and sand.

Overview 

At Goubbet-al-Kharab, near the western end of the Gulf of Tadjoura, there are steep cliffs and a bay that was turned dark green by black lava. A number of active volcanoes are located inland from here. Another popular tourist attraction is the Day Forest National Park for conserving rare trees on Mount Goda. Near the town of Ali Sabieh are famously red mountains and a national park full of many gazelles. The coastal plains, mountain ranges, and volcanic plateaus of the country make a picturesque sight. Some popular local attractions include the Presidential Palace, the Central Market, Maskali Islands, Moucha Island, Lake Abbe and Lake Assal. The coastlines of Djibouti harbor many stretches of beaches that are frequented by sun bathers and other visitors.

The Djiboutian government, realizing the great potential of development of national tourism, takes a variety of measures for this - for example, the maximum mode facilitating foreign investment in tourism infrastructure. Priority is given to the construction of hotels and the construction of roads that meet the latest international standards.

Regulation 
The tourist industry in Djibouti is regulated by the Ministry of Commerce and Tourism. According to the UNWTO, the annual number of tourists visiting the country is uncertain. However, international tourism locally generated $21 million USD in revenue in 2012.

Arrivals by country 

According to Office National du Tourisme de Djibouti (ONTD) figures, almost half of all visitors, or 48%, came from France, with 21% arriving from other European countries. The third-largest group came from Gulf states. Visitors from Africa represented just 6%, with the majority of them coming from Ethiopia. Finally, visitors from Asia and North America represented minor percentages at 5% and 3%, respectively.

Attractions 

Djibouti has a number of local attractions, consisting of historical sites, National Park, beaches and mountain ranges.

Local attractions 
 Djibouti City - The People Palace 
 Djibouti City - Rue Venice 
 Djibouti City - The Presidential Palace

Day Forest National Park 

Day Forest National Park established in 1939, protects the Goda Mountains. and also is the largest forest in Djibouti.

Foods 

Djibouti has many popular restaurants serving their local foods to tourists.

Historical sites 
 Tadjoura – Korijib is one of the oldest mosques in the Horn of Africa.
 Djibouti City – The Grand Mosque of Hamoudi.
 Loyada – Beach and palm grove, with the tombs of important historical leaders in the region.

Beaches 

 Siesta Beach – Djibouti City
 Red Sea Beach – Near Obock
 Khor Ambado – Near Djibouti City
 Le Sable Blanc – Tadjoura
 Heron Beach – Djibouti City

Mountain ranges 
 Goda Mountains
 Arrei Mountains
 Mabla Mountains
 Garbi

Islands 
 Moucha Island
 Maskali Islands
 Seven Brothers Islands

Salt lakes 
 Lake Abbe
 Lake Assal

References 

 
Djibouti